Haider Qureshi,Qureshi Ghulam Haider Arshad born on 1 September 1953 in Rabwah, Punjab, He is a Pakistani Urdu poet, short story writer, essayist, critic, editor and journalist. He writes in Urdu.

Personal life

Haider Qureshi was born in Rabwah, Chiniot District, Punjab, Pakistan He belongs to a Siraiki-speaking family. His father Qureshi Ghulam Sarwar was from Khanpur, Rahim Yar Khan. Haider Qureshi began writing verses in the age of 18. After passing his secondary level in 1968, he started working at a sugar mill, in the same year he wrote his first romantic story. He wrote his first ghazal in 1971 soon after his marriage. 
Later he obtained his Master of Arts (M.A.) in Urdu literature in 1974.
Haider Qureshi moved to Germany in 1994, and is living there uptil. He is now a German Nationality holder having Pakistani background.

Literary career

Qureshi was an active member of literary circles in Khanpur. His six publications are related to anthologies of ghazal, nazm and mahiya. He had also penned short stories, sketches,memories, inshaiya (light essays), a travelog of his pilgrimage to Mecca and a literary collection of his 11 Books Umre-La ' haasil ka Haasil  (The outcome of futile life). He is also a strong supporter of Urdu mahiya and has been both praised and criticised for his work on mahiya in the poetry circles.

He is the editor of the literary Urdu magazine Jadeed Adab, first launched from Khanpur in 1978, and later from Germany.
Qureshi's poetry has been translated into English, Arabic, German and Turkish.

Most of his literary work is comprised in the book Umr-e-Lahaasil Ka Haasil, a Kulliyat of both poetry and prose.

Jadeed Adab
Jadeed Adab   was an Urdu literary magazine based in Germany founded by Haider Qureshi; he remains its editor-in-chief. It is published from Germany, Pakistan and India, in print form and on the internet. It was first launched  in 1978  from Khanpur, Pakistan. Farhat Nawaz was the co-editor of Jadeed Adab Khanpur in Pakistan.

Jadeed Adab was founded in 1978 from Khanpur, Pakistan, by Haider Qureshi at the cost of his spouse Mubarika Haider's jewelry which he sold one after another until all were sold and the magazine ceased to be published.  It is published from Germany, Pakistan and India, and it is available both in print form and on the internet. After several years the magazine was restarted from Germany.

Jadeed Adab was (until the last 2012 issue) the only regularly published Urdu literary magazine both in print form and on the internet.

Views
Dawn newspaper praised his poetry remarking;

Bibliography
Poetry

 Sulagtay Khawab (Smoldering Dreams)  Tajdeed Ishaat Ghar Lahore, Islamabad, Pakistan. 1991

 Umre GurezaN (Reluctant Life)  Tajdeed Ishaat Ghar Lahore, Islamabad, Pakistan. 1994

 Mohabbat kay Phool (Flowers of Love) Nayab Publications Lahore. 1996

 Duaaey Dil (prayer from the Heart) Nusrat Publishers Lahore 1997

 GhazlaiN, Nazmain, Mahiay  Sarwar Adabi Academy Germany 1998

  Qafas Kay Andar (Inside The Cage) Akkas International Islamabad, 2013

 Dard Sumandar (Limitless pain)   2014

 Zindgi (Life)  2014

Prose
 Roshani ki Basharat(The Prophecy of Light.) – Tajdeed Ishaat Ghar Lahore, Islamabad 
 "Qissay Kahaniyan"(Anecdotes and Stories) 
 Afsaane (Short Stories)– Mayaar Publications Delhi, India. 1999
 Atmi Jang (Nuclear War)– Mayaar Publications Delhi, India. 1996
 Main Intezaar kerta hoon (And I Wait)– Sahitia Bharat, Delhi, India. 1999
 Meri Mohabbatein(Tales of my Heart)– Mayaar Publications Delhi, India. 1996–1998
 Soo-e-Hejaaz*(Journey to Makkah & Madeena)– Mayaar Publications Delhi, India. 2000–2004
 Khatti Meethi Yaadein (sweet and sour Memories) 
 Faaslay'Qurbaten (Aloofness and Intimacies) 
 "Abba Ji aur Ammi Ji"(My Father and Mother) 
 "Hayat e Mubarika Haider"(Biography of Mubarika Haider) 
 Mubarika Mahal (Mubarika Palace)
 " Beemari ya Roohani Tajrabah" (Illness or Spiritual Experience)

Research and critics books
 Dr. Wazir Agha ahad saaz shakhshiyat –(Dr. Wazir Agha History Maker).1995
 Hasil e Mutalea (Study gains).
 Tassuraat (Impressions).
 Mazameen aur Tabsaray (Essays and Reviews). 
 Dr. Gopichand Narang aur Ma baad Jadeediat (Dr. Gopichand Narang and postmoderism). 
 Dr. Satyapal Anand ki Boodni, NaBoodni
 Hamara Adabi Manzar Namah (Our Literary Scenario). 
 Mazameen o Mabahes (Essays and debates).
 Urdu mein Mahiya Nigari –(Mahiya poetry in Urdu) Farhad Publications Rawalpindi, Pakistan.  1999
 Urdu Mahiay ki Tehreek (Urdu Mahiya movement). 
 Urdu Mahiye ke Baani Himmat Rai Sharma –(Founder of Urdu Mahia Himmat Rai Sharma).
 Mahiay ke Mabahes (Debates on Mahiya). 
 Urdu Mahiya (Mahiya in Urdu). 
 Urdu Mahiya Tehqeeq o Tanqeed (Urdu Mahiya:Research and Criticism).

University Research Thesis on the literary work of Haider Qureshi
 PHD Topic "Haider Qureshi Shakhsiat aur Adabi Jahten" (Haider Qureshi Personality & literary facets) year 2013,
Research Sholar Dr. Abdul Rab Ustaad, Gulbarga University Gulbarga, India. 
 M.Phil. Topic "Haider Qureshi ki Adabi Khidmaat.(Literary contribution of Haider Qureshi)   year 2014,
Researcher Aamir Sohail, Hazara University Mansehra, Pakistan. 
 M. Phil Topic "Haider Qureshi Hayat o Khidmaat" (Haider Qureshi Life & contribution to literature) year 2013,
Researcher Anjum Aara, Calcutta University, Kolkata, India. 
 M.Phil. Topic "Haider Qureshi bahesiat Mohaqqeq aur Naqqad"(Haider Qureshi as a Researcher and a Critic) year 2018,
Researcher Sughra Begum, Federal Urdu University, Islamabad, Pakistan. 
 M.Phil. Topic "Haider Qureshi ki Shairi ka Mutalea"(A study of Haider Qureshi's poetry)  year 2014,
Researcher Hriday Bhano Pratap, Jawahar Lal Nehru university Delhi, India. 
 M.Phil. Topic "Haider Qureshi ki Afsana Nigari ka Mutalea"(A study of Haider Qureshi's short stories) year 2014,
Researcher Razeena Khan, Jawahar Lal Nehru university Delhi, India. 
 M.A. Topic "Sherul mehjer inda Haider Qureshi... Ma-alTarjuma"Arabic,(Urdu poetry in other countries in the light of Haider Qureshi 's poetry ... this thesis is written in Arabic after translating 4 poetry books of Haider Qureshi) year 2015,
Researcher Ahmad Abdurba Abbas, Azhar University, Cairo, Egypt. 
 M.A. Topic "Haider Qureshi Shakhsiat aur Fann"(Haider Qureshi Personality & literary work)   year 2002,
Researcher Munazzah Yasmeen, Islamiah University Bahawal Pur, Pakistan.
 M.Phil. Topic "Majalla Jadeed Adab ki Adabi Khidmaat"(The contribution of"Jadid Adab" to literature) year 2018,
Researcher Kanwal Tabassum, Federal Urdu University, Islamabad.Pakistan. 
 M.A. Topic "Jadeed Adab men shaey honay walay Mabahes",(Literary debates published in " Jadid Adab ") year 2009,
Researcher Shazia Humera, Islamia University Bahawal Pur, Pakistan. 
 M.Phil. Topic "Risala Jadeed Adab ki Adabi Khidmaat.. Tehqeeqi o Tanqeedi Mutalea"
(A critical review to evaluate literary contribution of "Jadid Adab") year2018,
Researcher Mohamad Shoaib, Hazara University Mansehra, Pakistan.

See also
 List of Pakistani poets
 List of Urdu language poets
 List of Pakistani writers
 List of Urdu language writers
 List of Pakistani journalists
 List of magazines in Pakistan

References

External links
 Official website
 "A Souvenir Day of Life"
 Collection of poems, (translated) 
 H.Q. ka Kolkata aur Delhi ka Safar
 ALL THE BOOKS
 "Jadeed Adab Mira ji Number" DAILY TIMES 23.09.12
 Jadeed Adab emagazine
 List Of All The Books By Haider Qureshi
 University Research Thesis on the Literary Work of Haider Qureshi

1952 births
Living people
Pakistani male journalists
Pakistani poets
Pakistani expatriates in Germany
People from Rahim Yar Khan District
Punjabi people
Urdu-language poets from Pakistan
People from Chiniot District